White Cliffs is an unincorporated community and census-designated place (CDP) in McKinley County, New Mexico, United States. It was first listed as a CDP prior to the 2020 census.

The CDP takes its name from a set of  cliffs that rise  to the north.

Demographics

Education
It is in Gallup-McKinley County Public Schools.

References 

 

Census-designated places in McKinley County, New Mexico
Census-designated places in New Mexico